Paul Maher (born 8 November 1994) is an Irish hurler who plays for Tipperary Intermediate Championship club Moyne–Templetuohy and at inter-county level with the Tipperary senior hurling team. He usually lines out as a goalkeeper.

Playing career

University of Limerick

On 11 March 2015, Maher lined out in goal for the University of Limerick when they faced Waterford Institute of Technology in the Fitzgibbon Cup final replay. UL secured a 2-18 to 1-14 victory.

Moyne-Templetuohy

Maher joined the Moyne–Templetuohy club at a young age and played in all grades at juvenile and underage levels.

On 2 November 2014, Maher lined out in goal when Moyne–Templetuohy faced Thurles Sarsfields in the final of the Tipperary Intermediate Championship. Moyne–Templetuohy won by 1-18 to 0-10.

Tipperary

Minor and under-21

Maher made his first appearance for the Tipperary minor team on 2 May 2012. He lined out in goal in the 6-21 to 0-11 defeat of Kerry in the Munster Championship. On 15 July, he won a Munster Championship medal following Tipperary's 1-16 to 1-12 defeat of Clare in the final. On 4 September, Morris was at centre-forward when Tipperary faced Limerick in the All-Ireland final. He was Tipperary's top scorer once again in the 1-21 to 0-17 victory. On 9 September, Maher was again in goal for Tipperary's 2-13 to 1-16 draw with Dublin in the All-Ireland final. The replay on 30 September saw Maher win an All-Ireland medal after a 21-8 to 1-11 victory.

Maher joined the Tipperary under-21 team as substitute goalkeeper for the 2013 Munster Championship. On 7 August, he was an unused substitute when Tipperary suffered a 1-17 to 2-10 defeat by Clare in the Munster Championship final.

On 16 July 2014, Maher made his first appearance for the Tipperary under-21 team. He lined out in goal in Tipperary's 5-19 to 1-25 defeat by Clare in the Munster Championship semi-final.

Maher ended his tenure with the under-21 team with a 3-16 to 3-14 defeat by Limerick in the Munster Championship.

Senior

Maher made his first appearance for the Tipperary senior team on 28 January 2018. He lined out in goal in Tipperary's 1-21 to 0-19 National League defeat by Clare.

On 30 June 2019, Maher was an unused substitute when Tipperary suffered a 2-26 to 2-14 defeat by Limerick in the Munster final. On 18 August 2019, he was again named amongst the substitutes when Tipperary faced Kilkenny in the All-Ireland final. Maher ended the game with an All-Ireland winners' medal following the 3-25 to 0-20 victory.

Career statistics

Honours

Fitzgibbon Cup
Fitzgibbon Cup (1): 2015

Moyne–Templetuohy
Tipperary Intermediate Hurling Championship (1): 2014

Tipperary
All-Ireland Senior Hurling Championship (1): 2019
All-Ireland Minor Hurling Championship (1): 2012
Munster Minor Hurling Championship (1): 2012

References

1994 births
Living people
Moyne-Templetuohy hurlers
Tipperary inter-county hurlers
Hurling goalkeepers